Cypress Records is a record label which was distributed by A&M Records between 1988 and 1990.

References

External links
 Cypress Records Label history, artist roster, Billboard performance.
 Cypress Records photo gallery

See also 
 List of record labels

American record labels
Record labels established in 1988